Georg (Göran) Wahlenberg (1 October 1780 – 22 March 1851) was a Swedish naturalist. He was born in Kroppa, Värmland County.

Wahlenberg matriculated at Uppsala University in 1792, received his doctorate in Medicine in 1806, was appointed botanices demonstrator in 1814, and professor of medicine and botany in 1829, succeeding Carl Peter Thunberg. He was the last holder of the undivided chair that in the previous century had been held by  Linnaeus. After his death in 1851, the chair was divided into more delimited professorships, and botany became the main duty of the borgströmian professorship, at the time held by Elias Fries.

Wahlenberg made his main work in the field of plant geography and published, among other things the Flora lapponica (1812) and other works on the plant world of northernmost Sweden. He was among the first major scholars to contribute to the plant taxonomy and geography of the High Tatras in the Habsburg monarchy where he carried out research in 1813 (he also determined mountain elevations, but some were later disproved by Ludwig Greiner). Two of the highest mountain lakes in the Tatras, now in Slovakia, are named Upper Wahlenberg Tarn (Vyšné Wahlenbergovo pleso; elevation ) and Lower Wahlenberg Tarn (Nižné Wahlenbergovo pleso) in his memory.

Wahlenberg was elected a member of the Royal Swedish Academy of Sciences in 1808.

The flowering plant genus Wahlenbergia and the crustose lichen genus Wahlenbergiella are named after him, as was a species of wood-rush: Luzula wahlenbergii. He died in Uppsala.

See also
 Wahlenbergfjord, a fjord named in his honour.

References

1780 births
1851 deaths
Swedish phycologists
Pteridologists
Botanists with author abbreviations
Swedish mycologists
Swedish botanists
Members of the Royal Swedish Academy of Sciences
Burials at Uppsala old cemetery